Diceroprocta semicincta is a species of cicada in the family Cicadidae. It is found in Central America and North America.

Subspecies
These two subspecies belong to the species Diceroprocta semicincta:
 Diceroprocta semicincta nigricans Davis, 1942
 Diceroprocta semicincta semicincta (Davis, 1925)

References

Further reading

External links

 

Articles created by Qbugbot
Insects described in 1925
Diceroprocta